Akriya (Sanskrit: अक्रिय ) is a Sanskrit adjective (derived from the verb kr) which means – inactive, dull, torpid, without essential works, abstaining from religious rites, without action of any kind, epithet of god, worthless, good for nothing; – या Akriyā (Sanskrit: अक्रिया) means – inactivity, neglect of duty. In the Bhagavad Gita, the word akriya refers to the person, who having renounced all desires and gained peace within, is not bound to perform any actions, rituals or works; such a person does not find any reason to perform any duty. According to Akriyavada, man's suffering or pleasures are not because of his own actions but because of other factors. From Śrimad Bhāgavatam (Sl.IX.17.10) it is learnt that the son of Rabhā was Rabhasa whose son was Gambhira who was the father of Akriya, all descendants of Ksatrvrddha rulers of Kasi. Akriya was a Brahmvida.

Krishna discusses the subject of Dhyanayoga in detail (in the 6th chapter of the Bhagavada Gita) after declaring that Sankhyayoga and Karma yoga both lead to the highest goal, the latter being easier of practice, Krishna tells Arjuna (Bhagavada Gita (VI.1) that :-

अनाश्रितः कर्मफलं कार्यं कर्म करोति यः |
स सन्यासी च योगी च न निरग्निर्न चाक्रियः ||

"He who does his duty without expecting the fruit of actions is a Sannyasi (Sankhyayogi) and a Yogi (Karmayogi) both; he is no Sannyasi (renouncer) who has merely renounced the sacred fire; even so he is no Yogi, who has merely given up all activity."

In other words, he explains that attachment naturally stimulates desire for the fruit of actions, a Karmayogi having renounced all thoughts of the attains true knowledge which is the fruit of both disciplines; the ideal Yogi is he who having renounced all activities remains constantly engaged in meditation and whose mind is free from all evils. The word, Akriya, stands for one who has totally abandoned all forms of activity and is wholly absorbed in meditation. Krishna further explains that Sannyasa is Yoga and one who has not given up thoughts of the world is not a Yogi.

During Buddha's time the main organised Sramana schools were Buddhist, Ajivaka, Lokayata, Jain and Ajñāna schools. The Ajivikas believed that each individual soul passes automatically to experience the final peace after experiencing all possible kind of life; they developed an elaborate system of divination and prognostication. From Mahā-vagga, a Jain text, it is learnt that Buddha had taught the akriyāvāda to Sīha, who was once a lay disciple of Mahāvira. And, from Mahācittārisaka of the Majjhima Nikaya, it is learnt that two Utkala tribes –  Vassa and Bhañña, had renounced their faith in ahetuvāda, akriyāvāda and nāstikavāda and embraced Buddhism. Akriyā-vāda or the Doctrine of Non-action, which greatly influenced the Buddhist and Hindu thought was propounded by Purana Kassapa, who died in 499 BCE (or 503 BCE), and was a contemporary of Buddha and Mahavira both of whom had rejected this doctrine according to which the soul is passive and no action, good or bad affects the soul, and therefore, there is no cause or effect (consequence) and no merits or demerits.

According to Mayavada of Shankara, – what the mind sees is a reality, it is the Atman, it is Brahman but the ideas, the terms in which the mind sees is false, what it sees is not the truth. Buddha had not defined Nirvana and had remained vague, but Shankara by terming the action-less and peaceful Atman as shanta akriya Sacchidananda accepted that the law of karma was applicable to this false world and replaced the notion of the non-self with the knowledge of the real self, it is so because according to Advaita Vedanta, Atman is actionless (akriya), changeless and eternal (kutasthanitya), and, according to Śuddhādvaita of Vallabhacarya, the three lakshanas of the Jivātman are – a) it is cognized through I-consciousness, it is beginning-less, nirguna and regulator of Prakṛti, b) its nature is self-luminosity and c) associated with though unaffected by gunas and dosas of the universe it is eligible for liberation; by nature akriya ('non-doer') assumes the role of the karta ('doer') and the karma ('object').

See also
Akriyavada

References

Vedanta
Sanskrit words and phrases
Hindu philosophical concepts